Joe Richards may refer to:

Musicians
Joe Richards (cellist) on Casanova (The Divine Comedy album)
Joe Richards (mixing engineer) on Charcoal Charlie

Others
Joe Richards (brothel owner), owner of Cherry Patch Ranch brothels
Joe Richards (chairman of the Football League), see London Road Stadium
Joe Richards, actor in The Wild Ride
Joe Richards (British parliamentary candidate), for Hackney North and Stoke Newington (UK Parliament constituency) and Southampton Test (UK Parliament constituency)

See also
Joseph Richards (disambiguation)
Jo Richards (disambiguation)